Pierre Boucher Hospital is a Canadian hospital located on Jacques Cartier Boulevard in Longueuil, Quebec. Inaugurated in 1982, the hospital is the regional health centre for 245,000 people located in the borough of Le Vieux-Longueuil, as well as the cities and towns of Boucherville, Varennes, Verchères, Sainte-Julie, Saint-Amable, Calixa-Lavallée and Contrecœur.

The hospital provides general, specialized and ultraspecialized health care, and is also the location of 3,400 births per year. The hospital is home to 329 beds, and its emergency department is overcrowded at 55,000 visits per year. In 2003, the Government of Quebec invested $60 million into the hospital, which was expanded and renovated. The hospital also transfers patients to the nearby, larger, Hôpital Charles-LeMoyne.

References

External links
 CSSS Pierre-Boucher
 Fondation de l’Hôpital Pierre-Boucher

Hospital buildings completed in 1982
Buildings and structures in Longueuil
Hospitals in Quebec
Hospitals established in 1982
Heliports in Canada
Certified airports in Quebec
1982 establishments in Quebec